Phyllonorycter viminetorum is a moth of the family Gracillariidae. It is found from Latvia to the Pyrenees and Italy and from Ireland to Ukraine.

The wingspan is 8–9 mm. The antennae with the apex
whitish. Forewings golden-brown, sprinkled with dark fuscous; a slender white median streak from base to near middle; a triangular white dorsal spot at 1/3 reaching basal streak; an angulated sometimes interrupted median fascia, three ill-defined posterior costal and two dorsal spots white, anteriorly dark margined; an elongate blackish apical dot. Hindwings are dark grey. The larva is pale yellowish; dorsal line greenish; head pale brown.

The larvae feed on Salix viminalis. They mine the leaves of their host plant. They create a lower-surface tentiform mine close to the leaf margin and normally also close to the petiole. There are often two mines in a single leaf. The mine in contracted in a tube-like fashion. The pupa yellowish brown and there is no visible cocoon. The frass is deposited in a corner of the mine.

References

viminetorum
Moths of Europe
Moths described in 1854